Relentless is the brand name of an energy drink created in February 2006 by The Coca-Cola Company. In the year ending 2010, sales of the product in the UK increased by 28 percent. After a deal on 14 August 2014 seeing Coca-Cola purchase a 16.7% stake in Monster Energy, the ownership of the Relentless brand (along with other Coca-Cola Energy brands) was transferred to Monster Energy and Monster Energy's non-energy brands transferred to Coca-Cola.

In 2011, the drink was the subject of court proceedings for breach of trademark by Relentless Records.

Relentless
Relentless is sold in 500 ml and 355 ml cans. It is marketed as being produced for "those with need of strong stimulation". The product's label includes a caution stating that Relentless is not suitable for children, pregnant women or those sensitive to caffeine. Relentless is marketed to provide continuing energy with the slogan of "No Half Measures" (a reference to the can size, which is twice that of a standard 250 ml can of Red Bull). With the gradual release of new flavours, the original flavour was renamed "Origin".

Relentless was introduced to the New Zealand market in May 2008 by Coca-Cola Amatil. It is only available in a 440 ml can. In April 2009, CCA replaced the Relentless drink range with the Mother Energy Drink range, which is imported from Australia.

Each can used to contain an extract of poetry, taken from the works of poets including John Milton, Lord Byron, William Wordsworth, Edgar Allan Poe, William Ernest Henley, Albrecht Dürer and Percy Bysshe Shelley.

Artwork and packaging
The original Relentless logo and original packaging were designed by Rebecca Wright.

The Relentless brand magazine This Is the Order (commissioned by Erasmus Partners in 2008) was created and designed by Rebecca Wright in collaboration with The Church of London Publishing.

Film making
Relentless Energy have produced two feature-length documentary films which focus on the area of extreme sports. The first, which was released in May 2009, called Powers of Three, is a surf documentary set in Ireland and was available to watch for free on the Relentless Website.
The follow-up films, Lives of the Artists and Lives of the Artists II: Follow Me Down, were released in December 2009 and March 2010, respectively.

In 2012 Relentless produced a commercial associating car vandalism with drinking the product, with the assistance of the rapper Professor Green, who walked over cars, to the anger of their drivers.

Nutritional information
Ingredients: Carbonated Water, Sugar, Citric Acid, Taurine (0.4%), Glucuronolactone (0.24%), Acidity Regulator (E331), Colour (Caramel E150d and E104), Flavourings, Preservative (E202, E211), Caffeine, Inositol, Vitamins (Niacin, Pantothenic Acid, B3, B6, B12), Guarana.

Relentless contains 32 mg of Caffeine per 100 mL, in a standard can size of 500 mL (16.9 US fl oz), or about 160 mg of Caffeine in total.

Sponsorship
Relentless sponsor various teams and athletes from the core sports in the UK.

In October 2006, Relentless teamed up with Motorcross Team Rob Hooper's Suzuki to create "Relentless Suzuki." Lewis Gregory, Jamie Law and Alex Snow are the riders for the team, which will compete in all the major UK and European MX2 events.

Relentless also teamed up with TAS Suzuki, a Northern Ireland-based motorcycle road racing team, and the team is now known as "Relentless Suzuki by TAS Racing". The team fields bikes in the British Superbike Championship, with riders Michael Laverty in the Superbike class and Ian Lowry in the Supersport class (which was won by Laverty in 2007 on the Relentless Suzuki). Cameron Donald and Guy Martin race at International road racing events, such as the Isle of Man TT, North West 200, and Ulster Grand Prix, for the team. Donald and Anstey recorded a 1 – 2 for the team in the first race of the 2008 TT, the Dainese Superbike Race. Relentless was the title sponsor of Faithless frontman Maxi Jazz in 2006 during his Porsche Carrera Cup Great Britain campaign.

Also in 2008, Relentless sponsored Formula Palmer Audi driver Emma Selway.

Mike & Andrew Jordan also had Relentless sponsorship on their British Touring Car Championship Honda Integras.

Relentless was a main sponsor of the Reading and Leeds festivals in 2007. There were large stalls shaped like giant Relentless cans solely dedicated to selling the drink. There were also copious flags and signs dotted around the festival sites.

Relentless has renewed the sponsorship of the Leeds and Reading festivals for 2008 after Carling discontinued their sponsorship of the music festival.

In January 2009 Relentless began sponsoring the annual Kerrang! Tour put together by British music magazine Kerrang!.

In 2009 Relentless was the principal sponsor of the Newquay Boardmasters festival.

Relentless is the primary sponsor of Uniwake, the UK's national organisation for inter University wakeboarding events. The sponsorship began in May 2009 and continues to present day. This includes the BUCS Student Wakeboarding Championships held in June each year at Sheffield Cable Waterski in Sheffield.

In 2010 Relentless was the title sponsor of Team Bath Racing the Formula Student Team from Bath University.

Relentless was the principal sponsor of the Wakestock music and wakeboarding festival in Abersoch, North Wales, with the festival therefore being branded Relentless Wakestock. But has now lost the event contract.  Now no Relentless branding appears on the Wakestock website.

Relentless is also sponsor of the "Bundesligaachter Mülheim an der Ruhr" a German rowing eight competing in the "1. Ruder Bundesliga", and its one sponsor of the Strakka Racing since 2009 in Endurance Racing.

Since 18 July 2013, Relentless is the main sponsor of the FC St. Pauli professional men football team in Hamburg, Germany.

References

External links
 Official Site
 The Order Magazine
 

All articles with unsourced statements
Energy drinks
Coca-Cola brands
Products introduced in 2006